Charles Henry Ludovic Sharman  (1881 – May 15, 1970) was an English-born Canadian civil servant. He served as Chief of the Narcotics Division in the Department of Pensions and National Health. Along with American Harry J. Anslinger, Sharman played a key role in the development of the global drug control regime. Sharman was the first Chair of the Commission on Narcotic Drugs.

References

External links
 RCA Museum biography
 UNODC biography

1881 births
1970 deaths
Canadian Companions of the Imperial Service Order
Canadian Commanders of the Order of the British Empire
Canadian Companions of the Order of St Michael and St George
Royal Canadian Mounted Police officers
English emigrants to Canada